12 teams participated in this tournament.

Teams

Semi-finalists

References
http://www.srilankafootball.com/division2.html
http://www.rsssf.com/tabless/srilanka2011.html#2semi

3